is a Japanese company based in Kyoto. The company is mainly involved in the production of beverages, food, printing and medical supplies.

Divisions

Takara Bio
Clontech Laboratories was acquired from BD Biosciences in 2005. In 2007, Clontech was involved in litigation with Invitrogen over patents for RNase H minus reverse transcriptase.

Subsidiaries of Takara Bio Inc. include Takara Bio USA (formerly Clontech Laboratories), a Mountain View, California-based manufacturer of kits, reagents, instruments, and services for biological research, as well as regional subsidiaries in Europe, Korea, China, and India. The main offices of Takara Bio USA moved to San Jose in August 2021.

Takara Shuzo
Takara Shuzo Co. produces sake, other beverages, and seasonings.  This division comprises the original business; the holding company including it was formed in 2001. Takara Shuzo also owns the Tomatin distillery of Highland single malt scotch whisky. Takara Shuzo Co. is the largest distiller of traditional shochu liquor in Japan.

References

Multinational companies headquartered in Japan
Manufacturing companies based in Kyoto
Drink companies of Japan
Biotechnology companies of Japan
Holding companies established in 1925
Japanese companies established in 1925
Sake
Japanese brands
Conglomerate companies established in 1925
Companies listed on the Tokyo Stock Exchange